Gabriella Ambrosio (born November 1954) is an Italian writer, journalist, academic, and advertising creative director. Her essays Siamo Quel che Diciamo ("We are what we say") and Le Nuove Terre della Pubblicita ("The New Advertising Land") are required advertising texts in several universities in Italy. Her first novel, Prima di Lasciarsi ("Before We Say Goodbye"), related to a suicide bombing in Jerusalem, has been translated into several languages including Hebrew and Arabic.

Education and early career 

She graduated with a degree in philosophy from the University of Naples, and became a journalist and a copywriter.

Career 
In 1992 she co-founded the advertising agency AM, now YesIAm, which has received international awards for its creative output. She was also a communications professor at La Sapienza University in Rome, and is a member of the Italian Art Directors Club, the association of Italian advertising professionals.

The novel 

Prima di Lasciarsi (Before We Say Goodbye), her first novel, is based on the true story of the Kiryat HaYovel supermarket bombing in Jerusalem, committed by Ayat al-Akhras, a seventeen-year-old Palestinian girl from the Dheisheh refugee camp. The book narrates the final hours in the lives of the bomber and her victims – a seventeen-year-old girl from Jerusalem and the security guard whose intervention saved the lives of the rest of the people at the busy market on that Passover Eve. The story begins at seven o'clock in the morning on the day of the attack and ends with the horrifying explosion. Despite the very short time span – seven hours – seen from the points of view of the different characters, the book tries to portray the complex reality between Israel and Palestine.

The book was published in Italy in 2004 by Nutrimenti Publishers and was awarded at the Festival du Premier Romance in Chambéry, France. In 2008 the book's publication in both in Arabic and Hebrew was sponsored by Amnesty International and employed by Israeli colleges and human rights organizations working in Israel and the Palestinian Territories as an educational tool.

It has been published in the UK, Australia, and in New Zealand by Walker Books, in France as Deuze Heures Avant ("12 Hours before"') '(Gallimard), by Fischer Verlag in Germany as Der Himmel uber Jerusalem ("The sky above Jerusalem"), as well as in Spain, Turkey, Greece, South Korea  and China.

It is studied as an example of Human rights literature in universities in UK and Canada.see: THE UNIVERSITY OF WESTERN ONTARIO. London. Canada. Department of English and Women's Studies. Testimony, Youth and Human Rights. Fall 2014

 Other works of fiction 
Her short story "Sticko" was published in 2009 in the book Freedom,Amnesty International UK: Synopsis and Reviews of "Freedom". Amnesty International. (10 December 1948).  an anthology of thirty-six short stories written by some of the leading fiction writers in the world, each inspired by an article of the Universal Declaration of Human Rights, and subsequently published in Canada, the US, Spain, Italy, Turkey, and Poland.

"Sticko" is about freedom from torture and echoes the events in Genoa, Italy, during G8 summit in 2001. It was nominated for the 2015 Pushcart Prize in the US by The Atlas Review.

 Published work 

Non-fiction
 "Siamo Quel che Diciamo" ("We Are What We Say") 
 "Le Nuove Terre della Pubblicita" ("The New Advertising Lands") 

Fiction
 Prima di Lasciarsi 2004 
 לפני הפרידה, Pardes, 2008 
 Prima di Lasciarsi, in Arabic, 2008 
 Before We Say Goodbye, 2010
 Douze heures avant, Gallimard (France), 2011
 Der Himmel uber Jerusalem, Fischer (Germany), 2012 
 Antes de despedirnos, Planeta, Spain, 2011 
 Ayrılmadan Önce, Kemzi Kitabevi, Turkey, 2011
 Prima di Lasciarsi, Psichogios, Greece, 2012 
 안녕이라고 말하기 전에, Joongang Books, Korea, 2012 
 哭泣的耶路撒冷 Jieli Publishing House, China. BSY310
 Freedom,'' 2009

References 

1954 births
Living people
Italian women novelists
Copywriters
University of Naples Federico II alumni
Academic staff of the Sapienza University of Rome
Italian women academics
Advertising directors
Italian women essayists
Italian essayists
Italian women journalists